This is a list of the suttas in the Majjhima Nikaya collection of middle-length discourses, part of the Tipiṭaka Buddhist Canon. English translations were done by Bhante Sujato.

General list

See also
 List of suttas
 List of Digha Nikaya suttas
 List of Majjhima Nikaya suttas
 List of Samyutta Nikaya suttas
 List of Anguttara Nikaya suttas
 List of Khuddaka Nikaya suttas

References

Source of translations

External links
 Majjhima Nikaya (Access to Insight)

Buddhism-related lists
Lists of books about religion